Crepidophorus is a genus of beetles belonging to the family Elateridae.

The species of this genus are found in Europe.

Species:
 Crepidophorus mutilatus (Rosenhauer, 1847)

References

Elateridae
Elateridae genera